Andy Bara (born 7 December 1982) is a Croatian former professional footballer who works as an agent. He played briefly in the Ekstraklasa for Świt Nowy Dwór Mazowiecki.

In 2011, Bara started a sports agency and brought Dani Olmo to Dinamo Zagreb from FC Barcelona.

Bara has also represented Marcelo Brozović.

References

External links
 

1982 births
Living people
Association football defenders
Croatian footballers
Świt Nowy Dwór Mazowiecki players
Ekstraklasa players
Croatian expatriate footballers
Expatriate footballers in Spain
Croatian expatriate sportspeople in Spain
Expatriate footballers in Poland
Croatian expatriate sportspeople in Poland
Association football agents